E-Z827, also known as E1b1b1b, is a major human Y-chromosome DNA haplogroup. It is the parent lineage to the E-Z830 and E-V257 subclades, and defines their common phylogeny. The former is predominantly found in the Horn of Africa and the Middle East; the latter is most frequently observed in North Africa, with its E-M81 subclade observed among the ancient Guanche natives of the Canary Islands. E-Z827 is also found at lower frequencies in Europe, and in isolated parts of Southeast Africa.

Subclades of E-Z827 and Distribution

Family Tree
The following phylogeny is based on the YCC 2008 tree  and subsequent published research as summarized by ISOGG.

E-Z827 (Z827) - E1b1b1b
E-V257/L19 (L19, V257) - E1b1b1b1
E-PF2431 (PF2431)
E-PF2438
E-Y10561
E-FGC18981
E-FGC38527
E-Y35933
E-FGC18960
E-Y33020
E-FGC18958
E-PF2440
E-PF2471
E-BY9805
E-M81 (M81)
E-M81*
E-PF2546
E-PF2546*
E-CTS12227
E-MZ11
E-MZ12
E-A929
E-Z5009
E-Z5009*
E-Z5010
E-Z5013
E-Z5013*
E-A1152
E-A2227
E-A428
E-MZ16
E-PF6794
E-PF6794*
E-PF6789
E-MZ21
E-MZ23
E-MZ80
E-A930
E-Z2198/E-MZ46
E-A601
E-L351
E-Z830 (Z830) - E1b1b1b2
E-M123 (M123)
E-M34 (M34)
E-M84 (M84)
E-M136 (M136)
E-M290 (M290)
E-V23 (V23)
E-L791 (L791,L792)
E-V1515 
E-V1515* 
E-V1486 
E-V1486* 
E-V2881 
E-V2881* 
E-V1792 
E-V92 
E-M293 (M293)
E-M293* 
E-P72 (P72)
E-V3065* 
E-V1700
E-V42 (V42)
E-V1785
E-V1785*
E-V6 (V6)

E-V257/L19 (E1b1b1b1)

 E-V257/L19 showed a parallel with its sibling clade E-V68 in the way that both clades show signs of having migrated from North Africa to southern Europe across the Mediterranean sea. 6 "E-V257/L19*" individuals were found in published samples who were E-V257/L19, but not E-M81. a Marrakesh Berber, a Corsican, a Sardinian, a Borana from Kenya, a southern Spaniard and a Cantabrian.

E-PF2431
PF2431 is the sister branch of M81 which was discovered in Paolo Francalacci (2011). Previously, it was designated L19*/V257*. This mutation has been discovered in North Africa (in Souss in Morocco, in central and eastern Algeria, West Nile in Egypt), the Sahel (Chad, Gambia), Western Europe (United Kingdom (Derbyshire), Germany, Switzerland, Spain, Italy) and Near Eastern (Turkey, Karabakh and Urmia).
It would have formed 13800 years ago and is thought to originate from the "green" Sahara. Its TMRCA is estimated at 10600 years by yfull.

Archeology unearthed the remains of a member of the Hungarian conquering elite was analyzed from branch E-FGC19010, it had been discovered in Sandorfalva in Hungary and is dated to the second half of the tenth century. A skeleton was discovered at the Monastery of San Pietro, Villa Magna in Italy, whose DNA belongs to the same branch and lived around 1180CE. Scientists have examined the DNA of a mass grave of victims of the bubonic plague in Ellwangen in Germany, this one dates from the 16th century and belongs to another branch E-FGC18981.

E-M81
E-V257's dominant sub-clade E-M81 is thought to have originated in the area of North Africa 14,000 years ago, but all Yfull members are M183 and have a TMRCA just 2700 years ago.

E-M81 is the most common subclade of haplogroup E-L19/V257. It is concentrated in the north africa, and is dominated by its E-M183 subclade. E-M183 is believed to have originated in northwestern Africa, and has an estimated age of 2284-2984 ybp.

The E-M183 subhaplogroup reaches a mean frequency of 42% in North Africa. It decreases in frequency from 100% in some isolated Berber populations to approximately 28.6% to the east of this range in Egypt. Because of its prevalence among these groups and also others such as Mozabite, Middle Atlas, Kabyle and other Berber groups, and coincidence with language dispersal age, it is sometimes referred to as a genetic "Berber marker". High levels, reaching 77.8%, among the Tuareg population inhabiting the Sahara in Burkina Faso, near Gorom-Gorom, are observed. There was a much lower frequency of 11.1% in the vicinity of Tanut in the Republic of Niger.

The E-M81 subclade is also quite common among North African Arabic-speaking groups.  It 31.5% among Moroccan Arabic-speakers,  and is generally found at frequencies around 45% in coastal cities of the Maghreb (Oran, Tunis, Tizi Ouzou, Algiers).

In this key area from Egypt to the Atlantic Ocean, report a pattern of decreasing STR haplotype variation (implying decreasing lineage age in those areas) from East to West (but reports West to East for M183), accompanied by a substantial increasing frequency. At the eastern extreme of this core range, M81 is found in 28.6% (10 out of 35 men) in El-Hayez in the Western desert in Egypt

The pattern of distribution and variance to be consistent with the hypothesis of a post Paleolithic "demic diffusion" from the East. The ancestral lineage of E-M81 in their hypothesis could have been linked with the spread of Neolithic food-producing technologies from the Fertile Crescent via the Nile, although pastoralism rather than agriculture. E-M81 and possibly proto-Afroasiatic language may have been carried either all the way from Asia, or they may represent a "local contribution to the North African Neolithic transition". A Near Eastern origin of proto-Afroasiatic speakers carrying E-M81, or its ancestral lineage, is inconsistent with the linguistic evidence, which seems to indicate an African origin of Proto-Afro-Asiatic speakers. There is no autochthonous presence of E-M81 in the Near East, indicating that M81 most likely emerged from its parent clade M35 either in the Maghreb, or possibly as far southeast as the Horn of Africa.

The E-M81 subclade has been found in ancient Guanche (Bimbapes) fossils excavated in Punta Azul, El Hierro, Canary Islands, which are dated to the 10th century (~44%).

Europe
In Europe, E-M81 has a widespread distribution at very low frequencies but is common mostly in the Iberian Peninsula, where unlike in the rest of Europe, shows an average frequency of 4.3% (49/1140) in the Iberian Peninsula with frequencies reaching 4% and 9% in two separate surveys of Galicia, 10% in Western Andalusia and Northwest Castile. However this study also includes 153 individuals from Majorca, Minorca and Ibiza islands as well as 24 individuals from Gascony which are not in the Iberian Peninsula. Without these 177 individuals, real average for Iberian Peninsula is 4.9% (47/963) it is more common than E-M78, with an average frequency around 5%. Its frequencies are higher in the western half of the peninsula with frequencies reaching 8% in Extremadura and South Portugal, 4% in one study and 9% in another in Galicia, 10% in Western Andalusia and Northwest Castile and 9% to 17% in Cantabria. The highest frequencies of this clade found so far in Europe were observed in the Pasiegos from Cantabria, ranging from 18% (8/45) to 41% (23/56). An average frequency of 8.28% (54/652) has also been reported in the Spanish Canary Islands with frequencies over 10%  in the three largest islands of Tenerife (10.68%), Gran Canaria (11.54%) and Fuerteventura (13.33%).

E-M81 is also found in other parts of Europe, such as Britain – especially Wales and Scotland – and France, where it has an overall incidence of 2.7% (15/555), with frequencies surpassing 5.0% in Auvergne (5/89) and Île-de-France (5/91). E-M81 was also observed in Italy with frequencies of 0,7% to 5,8% in Sardinia, approximately 2.12% overall in Sicily (but up to 7.14% in Piazza Armerina), and in very much lower frequency near Lucera (1.7%), in continental Italy, possibly due to ancient migrations during the Islamic, Roman, and Carthaginian empires. In a 2014 study by Stefania Sarno et al. with 326 samples from Cosenza, Reggio Calabria, Lecce and five Sicilian provinces, E-M81 shows an average frequency of 1.53%, but the typical Maghrebin core haplotype 13-14-30-24-9-11-13 has been found in only two out of the five E-M81 individuals. These results, along with the negligible contribution from North-African populations revealed by the admixture-like plot analysis, suggest only a marginal impact of trans-Mediterranean gene flows on the current SSI genetic pool.

Latin America
As a result of Spanish and Portuguese colonization of the Americas, this sub-clade is found throughout Latin America, for example 6.1% in Cuba, (8 out of 132), 5.4% in Brazil (Rio de Janeiro) (6 out of 112), "The presence of chromosomes of North African origin (E3b1b-M81; can also be explained by a Portuguese-mediated influx, since this haplogroup reaches a frequency of 5.6% in Portugal, quite similar to the frequency found in Rio de Janeiro (5.4%) among European contributors." and among Hispanic men from California and Hawaii 2.4% (7 out of 295),

Others
In smaller numbers, E-M81 men can be found in areas in contact with the Maghreb, both around the Sahara, in places like Sudan, and around the Mediterranean in places like Lebanon, Turkey, and amongst Sephardic Jews.

Distribution
The following gives a summary of most of the studies which specifically tested for E-M81, showing where its distribution is greater than 1% in Europe, North Africa, the Middle East and Latin America.

E-Z830 (E1b1b1b2)
A recently confirmed sub-clade of E-Z827, Z830, includes the confirmed sub-clades of E-M123, E-M293, and E-V42, and is a sibling clade to E-L19. Currently, the E-M35 phylogeny project recognizes four distinct clusters of Z830* carriers, two of which are exclusively Jewish in origin. The remaining two are significantly smaller, and include scattered individuals in Germany, Spain, Latin America, Egypt, and Ethiopia.

E-M123

E-M123 is mostly known for its major subclade E-M34, which dominates this clade.

E-V1515
A new clade (E-V1515) was defined by Trombetta et al. 2015, which originated about 12 kya (95% CI 8.6-16.4) in eastern  Africa   where  it  is  currently  mainly  distributed.  This clade  includes all the sub-Saharan haplogroups (E-V42,  E-M293,  E-V92,  E-V6)  reported  as  E-M35  basal  clades  in  a  previous  phylogeny.

We observed the highest frequency and diversity of this haplogroup in the northern part of the Horn of Africa (present day Eritrea and northern Ethiopia), where the majority of the deepest E-V1515 subhaplogroups and paragroups were found. In the southern part of the Horn (southern Ethiopia, Somalia and northern Kenya), haplogroup E-V1515 is almost exclusively represented by the recent (3.5 ka; 95% CI: 1.7–5.9 ka) subhaplogroup E-V1486. Further south, in southern Kenya and southern Africa, a single E-V1486 terminal clade, known as E-M293 (Henn et al. 2008), was found (fig. 3). This phylogeographic pattern is strongly suggestive of human movements from the northern part of the Horn to the Ethiopian/Kenyan borders between 12 ka (the coalescence of E-V1515) and 3.5 ka (the coalescence of E-V1486), and from here toward southern Africa across the equatorial belt in more recent times.

Multiple instances of commercially observed E-V1515 have also been detected in Arabia.

E-M293
E-M293 is a subclade of E-V1515. It was identified by ISOGG as the second clade within E-Z830. It was discovered before E-Z830 and is associated with the spread of pastoralism from Eastern Africa into Southern Africa. So far high levels have been found in specific ethnic groups in Tanzania and Southern Africa. Highest were the Datog (43%), Khwe (Kxoe) (31%), Burunge (28%), and Sandawe (24%). Two Bantu-speaking Kenyan males were found with the M293 mutation.
Other E-M215 subclades are rare in Southern Africa. The authors state...
Without information about M293 in the Maasai, Hema, and other populations in Kenya, Sudan, and Ethiopia, we cannot pinpoint the precise geographic source of M293 with greater confidence. However, the available evidence points to present-day Tanzania as an early and important geographic locus of M293 evolution.
They also say that "M293 is only found in sub-Saharan Africa, indicating a separate phylogenetic history for M35.1 * (former) samples further north".
E-P72. This is a subclade of E-M293.

E-V42
E-V42 was discovered in two Ethiopian Jews. It was suggested that it may be restricted to the region around Ethiopia. However, further testing by commercial DNA testing companies confirmed positive results for this subclade in Arabia as well.

E-V6
The E-V6 subclade of E-V1515 is defined by V6 and has been identified a significant presence of these lineages in Ethiopia, and also some in the neighboring Somali population. Among the Ethiopian and Somali samples, the highest were 14.7% among the Ethiopian Amhara, and 16.7% among the Ethiopian Wolayta.

E-V92
E-V92 was discovered in two Ethiopian Amhara. Like E-V6 and E-V42 it possibly only exists in the area of Ethiopia.

Phylogenetics

Phylogenetic History

Prior to 2002, there were in academic literature at least seven naming systems for the Y-Chromosome Phylogenetic tree. This led to considerable confusion. In 2002, the major research groups came together and formed the Y-Chromosome Consortium (YCC). They published a joint paper that created a single new tree that all agreed to use. Later, a group of citizen scientists with an interest in population genetics and genetic genealogy formed a working group to create an amateur tree aiming at being above all timely.  The table below brings together all of these works at the point of the landmark 2002 YCC Tree. This allows a researcher reviewing older published literature to quickly move between nomenclatures.

Original Research Publications
The following research teams per their publications were represented in the creation of the YCC Tree.

See also 
 Maghreb people

Genetics

Y-DNA E Subclades

Y-DNA Backbone Tree

References

Further reading 

 
 
 
 
 
 
 
 
 
 
 
 
 
 
 
 
 
 
 Pontikos D. "Phylogeographic refinement of haplogroup E" http://dienekes.blogspot.ru/2015/07/phylogeographic-refinement-of.html

External links 
Ftdna E-PF2431 Project
E-M35 Phylogeny Project Wiki
E-M35 Phylogeny Project (all labs site)
E-M35 Phylogeny Project Public Forum
FamilyTreeDNA - E-PF2431 Project
FamilyTreeDNA - E-M81 Project

E3b
Mediterranean